European route E61 forms part of the United Nations International E-road network, of which it is a Class A intermediate north–south route.  long, it connects the southern part of Austria to the Adriatic Sea.

Itinerary 
The E 61 routes through four European countries:

Austria

Slovenia

Italy 
 : Fernetti - Villa Opicina - Trieste
 : Trieste - Basovizza - Pesek di Grozzana

Slovenia 
 : Krvavi Potok - Kozina - Starod

Croatia 
 : Pasjak border crossing - Rupa interchange
 : Rupa - Rijeka (A6 Orehovica interchange)

External links 
 UN Economic Commission for Europe: Overall Map of E-road Network (2007)

61
E061
E061
E061
E061